Intercity-Express or Intercity Express may refer to:

 Intercity Express, in Germany and surrounding countries
 Intercity Express (Indian Railways)
 NSB InterCity Express, Norway
 Intercity Express Programme, UK procurement programme of replacement high speed trains for InterCity 125 and InterCity 225
 InterCity Express (Queensland Rail), Australian electrical multiple unit